Below is a list of justices who have served on the South Carolina Supreme Court.

External links
Chief Justices of the State of South Carolina, 1698-2000

J
South Carolina